Qianjin Zhidai Wan is a greyish-black pill used in Traditional Chinese medicine to "restore vital energy, arrest excessive leukorrhea and regulate menstruation". Its odor is slightly aromatic. It tastes astringent and slightly bitter. It is used where there is "morbid leukorrhea and menstrual disorders with aching in the back and abdominal pain due of deficiency of spleen and kidney, imbalance of chong-ren and downward flow of damp-heat ".

Chinese classic herbal formula

See also
 Chinese classic herbal formula
 Bu Zhong Yi Qi Wan

References

Traditional Chinese medicine pills